The first inauguration of James Monroe as the fifth president of the United States was held on Tuesday, March 4, 1817, in front of the Old Brick Capitol, where the Supreme Court building now stands. The inauguration marked the commencement of the first four-year term of James Monroe as president and Daniel D. Tompkins as vice president. The Chief Justice, John Marshall administered the oath of office.

Ceremony

On March 4, 1817, Monroe arrived at the Capitol at noon in front of a large crowd of around 8000 people, the largest crowd to gather in the city to that point. The ceremony, unlike previous inaugurations, took place outside on a platform because Congress could not agree on protocols for an indoor occasion. Henry Clay, unhappy that Monroe did not appoint him Secretary of State, had opposed an event in the House chamber and did not attend the inauguration. The weather was mild and sunny. The Marine Corps and some militia regiments were the first to greet Monroe on his arrival. 

After vice president Tompkins spoke briefly, Monroe, never a good public speaker, gave his inaugural address but was difficult for the audience to hear. He called for increased military buildup after the recent War of 1812 as well as unity between Republicans and Federalists to bring an end to factionalism.

See also
Presidency of James Monroe
Second inauguration of James Monroe
1816 United States presidential election

References

External links

More documents from the Library of Congress
Text of Monroe's First Inaugural Address

1817 in Washington, D.C.
1817 in American politics
Presidency of James Monroe
United States presidential inaugurations
March 1817 events